Rannar Vassiljev (born on 8 November 1981 in Rakvere) is an Estonian politician. He has been a member of the  XII Riigikogu. In 2015 he was Minister of Health and Labour.

Rannar Vassiljev graduated from Rakvere Gymnasium in 2000 and from the University of Tartu in 2004 with a degree in political science. In 2005–2009 he worked as the Deputy Mayor of Rakvere and in 2009–2010 as the Mayor of Rakvere. He is a member of Estonian Social Democratic Party.

References

Living people
1981 births
Social Democratic Party (Estonia) politicians
21st-century Estonian politicians
Members of the Riigikogu, 2011–2015
Members of the Riigikogu, 2019–2023
Government ministers of Estonia
Mayors of places in Estonia
University of Tartu alumni
Estonian people of Russian descent
People from Rakvere